Richard Montgomery Young (February 20, 1798–November 28, 1861) was a U.S. Senator from Illinois.

Young was born in Fayette County, Kentucky and was admitted to the bar in 1816.  In 1817, he moved his law practices to Jonesboro, Illinois, and was appointed a captain in the state militia.  He served in the Illinois state house from 1820 to 1822 and as a circuit court judge from 1825 to 1837.  He resigned his judgeship after being elected to the U.S. Senate in 1837 as a member of the Democratic Party.  As a federal Senator, he served one six-year term; during the first four of his six years in office he was Chairman of the Senate Committee on Roads and Canals.

Upon the end of his term in the Senate, he was appointed to the Illinois Supreme Court (1843–1847) and then became a land office commissioner by appointment of James K. Polk.  He served as the Clerk to the United States House of Representatives in 1850 and practiced law in Washington, D.C. from 1851 until his death.

Young was the presiding judge at the 1844 trial of the accused killers of Joseph Smith, the founder of the Latter Day Saint movement.

Young owned slaves.

References

External links 

1798 births
1861 deaths
Illinois state court judges
Democratic Party members of the Illinois House of Representatives
Clerks of the United States House of Representatives
Democratic Party United States senators from Illinois
Justices of the Illinois Supreme Court
General Land Office Commissioners
19th-century American politicians
19th-century American judges